Tommaso De Nipoti (born 23 July 2003) is an Italian footballer who plays as forward for  club Atalanta.

Career 
In 2017, De Nipoti moved from Udinese to Atalanta. He debbutted for Atalanta on 22 January 2022 in a 0–0 draw against Lazio.

References

External links 
 

Living people
2003 births
Italian footballers
Association football forwards
Serie A players
Udinese Calcio players
Atalanta B.C. players